Star Wars: Crucible is a Star Wars novel written by Troy Denning, released by Del Rey Books on July 9, 2013. Featuring Luke Skywalker, Han Solo and Leia Organa Solo, it is set 45 years after the 1977 film Star Wars. To date, it is the last Star Wars Legends novel to be released.

Plot
Set after the events of the Fate of the Jedi series.

External links
 

2013 American novels
2013 science fiction novels
American science fiction novels
Star Wars Legends novels
Del Rey books